Pantophaea jordani is a moth of the family Sphingidae. It is known from woodland and savanna from west Africa to Uganda.

The body and forewings are grey, with a wide, diffuse dark grey postmedial band and a dark diffuse spot at the costa, near the apex. The stigma is small, round and whitish. The Hindwings are white with a small dark spot at tornus. Females are larger, darker and have broader wings than males. The hindwings are dark grey.

References

Sphingini
Moths of Africa
Moths described in 1916
Insects of Uganda
Insects of West Africa
Fauna of the Central African Republic